The 1995 United Kingdom local elections took place on 4 May 1995. The Conservative Party lost over 2,000 councillors in the election, while the Labour Party won 48% of the vote, a record high for the party in local elections.

The elections were the first to be contested under Labour's new leadership of Tony Blair, who had been elected the previous year following the sudden death of his predecessor John Smith.

This was also the first election of 22 Welsh and 14 English unitary authorities, creating shadow authorities which ran in parallel with existing councils until taking power in April 1996, except for the new Isle of Wight Council which took power immediately.

England

Metropolitan boroughs

All 36 metropolitan borough councils had one third of their seats up for election.

Unitary authorities

These were the first elections to the first 14 unitary authorities established by the Local Government Commission for England (1992). They acted as "shadow authorities" until 1 April 1996.

‡ New ward boundaries from predecessor authorities

District councils

Whole council
In 167 districts the whole council was up for election.

These were the last elections to the district councils of Blackpool, Bournemouth, Bracknell Forest, Darlington, Leicester, Luton, Newbury, Nottingham, Plymouth, Poole, Rutland, The Wrekin, Torbay, Warrington and Windsor and Maidenhead before they were made unitary authorities by the Local Government Commission for England (1992).

These were also the last elections to the district councils of Hove and Rochester-upon-Medway before they were abolished and replaced by unitary authorities by the Local Government Commission for England (1992).

Third of council
In 107 districts one third of the council was up for election.

These were the last elections to the district councils of Derby, Milton Keynes, Portsmouth, Southampton, Stoke-on-Trent and Thamesdown before they were made unitary authorities by the Local Government Commission for England (1992).

These were also the last elections to the district council of Brighton before it was abolished and replaced by a unitary authority by the Local Government Commission for England (1992).

Scotland

These were the first elections to the 29 council areas established by the Local Government etc. (Scotland) Act 1994.

†Council was renamed shortly after election.

Wales

These were the first elections to the 22 principal areas established by the Local Government (Wales) Act 1994.

†Council was renamed shortly after election.

References

The local elections of 4 May 1995. House of Commons Library Research Paper 95/59. (Includes appendix in Scottish local elections of 6 April 1995).
Vote 1999 BBC News
Vote 2000 BBC News

 
1995
Local elections